Dupont, Louisiana may refer to:

Dupont, Avoyelles Parish, Louisiana, on Louisiana Highway 107
Dupont, Pointe Coupee Parish, Louisiana

See also
Dupont (disambiguation)